On December 22, 1984, Bernhard Goetz shot four young black men on a New York City Subway train in Manhattan after they allegedly tried to rob him. Goetz fled to  Bennington, Vermont before surrendering to police nine days after the shooting; he was charged with attempted murder, assault, reckless endangerment, and several firearms offenses. A jury subsequently found Goetz guilty of one count of carrying an unlicensed firearm and acquitted him of the remaining charges; for the firearm offense, he served eight months of a one-year sentence. In 1996, Darrell Cabey, one of the men Goetz shot, who was left paraplegic and brain damaged as a result of his injuries, obtained a $43 million civil judgment against Goetz.

Initially, Goetz, dubbed the "Subway Vigilante" by the New York press, received widespread public recognition and support. To his supporters, Goetz came to symbolize New Yorkers' frustrations with the high crime rates of the 1980s. But public opinion became divided as Goetz's statements and details of the shooting were released by the prosecution. Questions of what impact race—and racism—had on Goetz, the public reaction, and the criminal verdict were hotly debated. The incident sparked a nationwide debate on crime in major U.S. cities, the legal limits of self-defense, and the extent to which the citizenry could rely on the police to secure their safety. The incident has been cited as leading to successful National Rifle Association campaigns to loosen restrictions for concealed carrying of firearms.

Incident
In the early afternoon of Saturday, December 22, 1984, four young men from the Bronx, 19-year-olds Barry Allen, Troy Canty, and Darrell Cabey, and 18-year-old James Ramseur, boarded a downtown 2 train (a Broadway–Seventh Avenue express). Canty would later testify that the teenagers were en route to rob a video arcade in Manhattan; Allen had previously pleaded guilty to breaking into a video-game machine, and each of the teenagers had been previously arrested or convicted of various charges. Goetz boarded the train at the 14th Street station in Manhattan. At the time, about fifteen to twenty other passengers were on the R22 subway car, the seventh car of the ten-car train.

Troy Canty approached Goetz and made some overture for money: According to Canty, he said, "Can I have $5?" According to Goetz, Canty said, "Give me five dollars" in a "normal tone" of voice. Goetz subsequently pulled a handgun and fired five shots at the four, wounding them all. Cabey's spine was severed, resulting in brain damage and partial paralysis.

Shooter: Bernhard Goetz
Bernhard Hugo Goetz was born in the Kew Gardens neighborhood of New York City's Queens borough on November 7, 1947. His parents were German immigrants who met in the U.S. His father was Lutheran; his mother, who was Jewish, converted to Lutheranism. While growing up, Goetz lived with his parents and three older siblings in Upstate New York, where his father ran a dairy farm and a bookbinding business. Goetz attended boarding school in Switzerland before returning to the United States to earn a bachelor's degree in electrical engineering and nuclear engineering from New York University. By this time, the family had relocated to Orlando, Florida; Goetz joined them and worked at his father's residential development business. After a divorce, Goetz moved back to New York City, where he started an electronics business out of his Greenwich Village apartment.

Goetz reported that he had been the victim of a robbery in the Canal Street subway three years prior to the shooting. He said that three black teens had smashed him into a plate-glass door and threw him to the ground, injuring his chest and knee. Goetz struggled with one of the teens until police arrived, and the alleged attacker claimed that Goetz had, in fact, assaulted him. Goetz was, to his frustration, detained for six hours, while the person he accused was released in two and a half hours.  Goetz subsequently applied for a permit to carry a concealed handgun, on the basis of routinely carrying valuable equipment and large sums of cash, but his application was denied for insufficient need. He bought a 5-shot .38-caliber revolver during a trip to Florida.

Goetz had previously used racist language: Myra Freedman, Goetz's neighbor, reported overhearing Goetz having said, "The only way we're going to clean up this street is to get rid of the spics and niggers" at a community meeting 18 months before the shooting. Friedman's account was excluded from the criminal jury trial as hearsay, but, in a subsequent civil action, Goetz admitted to having used both epithets at a neighborhood meeting.

Goetz's flight and surrender
After the shooting, Goetz asked two frightened passengers if they had been injured, and both said they were not. Shortly afterwards, the train conductor entered the car and loudly exclaimed, "What's going on?" He approached Goetz and asked what happened. Goetz pointed to the north end of the car and then told him, "I don't know . . . they tried to rob me and I shot them." The conductor then went to the passengers to check if they were injured before returning to Goetz and asked if he was a police officer, which Goetz denied, and he then asked Goetz for the gun, which Goetz refused to turn over.

Goetz subsequently took a cab back to his 14th Street home and, in a rented car, fled north to Bennington, Vermont, where he burned the blue jacket he had been wearing and scattered pieces of the revolver in the woods. He stayed at various hotels in New England for several days.

On December 26, an anonymous hotline caller told New York City police that Goetz matched the gunman's description, owned a gun, and had been mugged previously. On December 29, Goetz called his neighbor, Myra Friedman, who told him that police had come by his apartment looking for him, and had left notes asking to be contacted as soon as possible. He gave his side of the story to Friedman and described his psychological state at the time:

Goetz returned to New York City on December 30, turned in the car, picked up some clothing and business papers at his apartment, rented another car, and drove back to New England. Shortly after noon the next day, he walked into the Concord, New Hampshire, police headquarters and told the officer on duty, "I am the person they are seeking in New York."

Police interview
Once the officer realized that Goetz was a genuine suspect, Goetz was given a Miranda warning, and he waived his right to have an attorney present. After an interview that lasted over an hour, a Concord detective asked Goetz to consent to making an audiotaped statement. Goetz agreed, and a two-hour statement was recorded. That evening, New York City detectives and an assistant district attorney arrived in Concord, and Goetz submitted to a two-hour videotaped interview. Both interviews were eventually played back for the grand juries, the criminal trial, and a civil trial years later. When the audiotape was first played in open court, Goetz was described by The New York Times as "confused and emotional, alternately horrified by and defensive about his actions, and obsessed with justifying them."

Goetz told police that he felt that he was being robbed and was at risk of violence, and he explained he had been both mugged once before and nearly mugged several times: I’ve been situations where I’ve shown the gun. . . . The threat, when I was surrounded, at at that point, showing the gun would have been enough, but when I saw this one fellow [(Canty)], when I saw the gleam in his eye . . . and the smile on his face . . . and they say it’s a joke and lot of them say it’s a joke."

Asked what his intentions were when he drew his revolver, Goetz replied, "My intention was to murder them, to hurt them, to make them suffer as much as possible."  Later in the tape, Goetz said, "If I had more bullets, I would have shot 'em all again and again. My problem was I ran out of bullets." He added, "I was gonna, I was gonna gouge one of the guys' [Canty's] eyes out with my keys afterwards", but said he stopped when he saw the fear in his eyes. He denied any premeditation for the shooting, something that had been speculated on by the press.

Goetz called New York City "lawless" and expressed contempt for its justice system, calling it a "joke," a "sham," and "a disgrace".

Arraignment and bond
Goetz was brought back to Manhattan on January 3, 1985, and arraigned on four charges of attempted murder, with bail set at $50,000. He was held in protective custody at the Rikers Island prison hospital. Refusing offers of bail assistance from the public and from his family, he posted bail with his own funds and was released on bond January 8.

Legal aftermath

Criminal action

Indictments

Manhattan District Attorney Robert Morgenthau asked a grand jury to indict Goetz on four counts of attempted murder, four of assault, four of reckless endangerment, and one of criminal possession of a weapon. On January 25, the grand jury refused to indict Goetz on the more serious charges, voting indictments only for unlawful gun possession—one count of criminal possession of a weapon in the third degree, for carrying in public the loaded unlicensed gun used in the subway shooting, and two counts of possession in the fourth degree, for keeping two other unlicensed handguns in his home.

In March 1985, Morgenthau announced that the state had obtained new evidence—an unnamed witness—and sought leave to convene a second grand jury; Judge Stephen Crane granted Morgenthau's motion. Morgenthau also granted immunity to Troy Canty and James Ramseur, which he had previously declined to do, allowing them to testify before the second grand jury. The second grand jury indicted Goetz on charges of attempted murder, assault, reckless endangerment and weapons possession. But, in January 1986, Judge Crane granted a motion by Goetz to dismiss these new indictments based on alleged errors in the prosecutor's instructions to the grand jury regarding justification and the judge's opinion that Canty and Ramseur "strongly appeared" to have perjured themselves. Although Judge Crane did not specify the bases for the latter finding, the New York Times reported that it appeared to be based on alleged statements by Canty, Ramseur, and Cabey: According to police officer Peter Smith, who responded to the shooting, Canty told him that the group was planning to rob Goetz, but Goetz shot them first, though Police Commissioner Benjamin Ward said through a spokesman that he did not find Smith's account credible. Ramseur gave an interview to the Cable News Network saying he believed Goetz thought he was going to be robbed. And Cabey, while in the hospital, allegedly told New York Daily News reporter Jimmy Breslin that the other members of the group planned to rob Goetz because he "looked like easy bait" (though Cabey denied involvement himself).

The prosecution appealed the case, maintaining that a self-defense justification required objective reasonableness and that the statements Judge Crane relied on did not indicate perjury or require dismissal. In July 1986, after an appellate division upheld Judge Crane's dismissal, the New York Court of Appeals reversed the appellate division and reinstated the charges. The high court clarified that a defendant's subjective perception of imminent danger does not, by itself, justify the use of force; instead, it held, that belief must be both subjectively held and objectively reasonable. Additionally, the court held that Judge Crane's opinion as to the veracity of Canty's and Ramseur's testimony was "speculat[ive]" and "particularly inappropriate": "[A]ll that has come to light is hearsay evidence that conflicts with part of Canty's testimony. There is no statute or controlling case law requiring dismissal of an indictment merely because, months later, the prosecutor becomes aware of some information which may lead to the defendant's acquittal."

Trial
In December 1986, jury selection began and in April, 1987, the trial commenced before a Manhattan jury of 10 whites and 2 blacks, of whom 6 had been victims of street crime. Goetz was represented by Barry Slotnick and Mark M. Baker.

Both prosecution and defense conceded that the jury would be required to consider several questions, including (1) whether the teenagers had acted as a group or as individuals, (2) whether Goetz had shot Cabey after the immediate threat was over, and (3) whether Goetz was threatened.

As to whether Goetz had been threatened, Canty testified that he was panhandling when he asked Goetz for $5. Ramseur testified that Canty approach Goetz alone and that he, Allen, and Cabey remained seated, but Ramseur's testimony was stricken after he professed his belief that Goetz would be acquitted regardless of the evidence and eventually refused to answer Slotnick's questions. Neither Goetz nor Cabey testified, and Allen took the Fifth Amendment. Amanda Gilbert, a witness, testified that Cabey, after being shot, told her, "I didn't do anything. He shot me for nothing," but her testimony was stricken as hearsay. The defense called Officer Smith, who testified as to Canty's alleged remarks that the group was going to rob Goetz. On cross examination, the prosecution pointed out that Smith had failed to report the statement to his superiors or to a reporter when giving a television interview.

Another point of contention at trial was whether Goetz had shot at least some of the men in the back. For the defense, Dominick DiMaio, Suffolk County's former medical examiner, testified that  Allen, Canty, Cabey, and Ramseur had been standing in a semi-circle around Goetz when he opened fire. But the county's then-current medical examiner, Charles Hirsch, offered rebuttal testimony that it was medically impossible to determine how the victims were positioned when shot, and he also found that the bullets that hit Allen and Cabey had traveled from back to front, suggesting that both had been shot in the back. Ballistics expert Joseph Quirk, for the defense, testified that Allen had been shot while ducking rather than while running away. On cross examination, Quirk conceded that the prosecution's theory was also consistent with the evidence, and, after being shown a photograph of a bullet-entry wound in Allen's back, Quirk admitted that he had based his theory as to Allen on incorrect information provided to him by the defense.

Specifically related to Goetz's shooting of Cabey, the parties contested whether Cabey had been struck by the fourth or fifth shot and whether, if the fifth, Goetz had paused before firing. According to the prosecution, Goetz shot the seated Cabey at point-blank range with his fifth bullet; the defense argued that Goetz had fired all five shots in short order and Cabey had been hit by the fourth shot before collapsing. One witness testified that, consistent with Goetz's since-recanted police statement, Goetz opened fire before approaching to within "two to three feet" of a seated Cabey; the witness demonstrated how Goetz stood directly in front of Cabey and fired downward shooting Cabey in the stomach. But the eight other witnesses who testified on the matter reported that all shots came in "rapid succession"—one said the firing lasted "about a second", and none of those eight testified that they had observed Goetz standing in front of Cabey.

Verdict and appeal
Goetz was acquitted of the attempted-murder and first-degree-assault charges and convicted of criminal possession of a weapon in the third degree–for carrying a loaded, unlicensed weapon in a public place. Goetz was originally sentenced to six months in jail, one year's psychiatric treatment, five years' probation, 200 hours community service, and a $5,000 fine. However, in November 1988, an appellate court overturned this sentence, finding that the state's gun laws required, at minimum, a one-year sentence. Goetz requested that the appellate court overturn the conviction entirely, arguing that the judge's jury instructions improperly discouraged jury nullification, but the appellate division and New York Court of Appeals disagreed.

On remand, Judge Crane sentenced Goetz to one-year incarceration and a $5,000 fine. Goetz ultimately served eight months.

Civil actions

Cabey v. Goetz
A month after the shootings, Cabey, represented by William Kunstler and Ron Kuby, filed a civil suit against Goetz. The civil case was tried in 1996. Unlike Goetz's criminal jury, which was predominantly white and from Manhattan, the civil jury was half African American and entirely from the Bronx. Additionally, crime in New York had fallen substantially since the criminal trial.

While race had only been subliminally addressed in the criminal trial, Cabey's civil-trial attorneys explicitly argued that Goetz had been motivated by race. Goetz admitted to previous use of racial language and to smoking PCP-laced marijuana during the 1980s. Kuby portrayed Goetz as a racist aggressor; Goetz's defense was that when surrounded he reacted in fear of being again robbed and beaten. Breslin testified as to Cabey's 1985 interview (where Cabey denied involvement but said the others had planned to rob Goetz), though Cabey's attorneys pointed out that Cabey had suffered brain damage prior to the interview and that Breslin's column described Cabey as "confused."

The jury found that Goetz had acted recklessly and had deliberately inflicted emotional distress on Cabey. Jurors awarded Cabey $43 million–$18 million for pain and suffering and $25 million in punitive damages. Goetz subsequently filed for bankruptcy, saying that legal expenses had left him almost penniless. A judge of the United States Bankruptcy Court ruled that the $43 million judgment was nondischargeable.

Because Goetz was only "sporadically employed as an electrical engineering consultant," the expectation was that 10% of Goetz's income for the next 20 years would be garnished. Stephen Somerstein, one of Cabey's attorneys, expressed some optimism that a portion of any book deal Goetz signed could contribute to the judgment. In 2000, Kuby, another Cabey attorney, told reporters that he had hired a firm specializing in debt collection to pursue Goetz, but he noted that Goetz "appear[ed] to be living in voluntary squalor." Asked in 2004 whether he was making payments on the judgment, Goetz responded "I don't think I've paid a penny on that", and referred any questions on the subject to his attorney.

Goetz's defamation claims
In 1990, Goetz filed a defamation action against Cabey; his mother, Sherry; and his attorneys, Kunstler and Kuby. The suit was dismissed.

In 1994, Goetz filed another defamation action related to My Life as a Radical Lawyer, a book by Kunstler, published by Carol Communications, Inc. Amongst other claims, Goetz objected to the book's description of him as a "paranoid" "murderous vigilante" who had "developed a hatred for blacks." Goetz specifically objected that the book's description of him as a racist hurt his "good name, reputation, feelings, and public standing." The court granted summary judgment in favor of the defendants, finding that the statements complained of were, varyingly, protected opinion (rather than actionable fact statements), not defamatory, or substantially true.

Public reaction and intersection with race
The shootings initially drew wide support from the public. A special hotline set up by police to seek information was swamped by calls supporting the shooter and calling him a hero. A month after the grand jury's decision, a report summarizing statements Goetz made to Concord police department—including the "You don't look so bad; here's another" statement—was released by the prosecution. At this point, support for Goetz started became less universal, though Morgenthau reported that the letters his office received were still running 3 to 1 in Goetz's favor. Nonetheless, questions of what impact race had on Goetz's thinking, the public's reaction, and the verdict by the (predominately white) criminal jury were hotly debated before, during, and after the trial. The Los Angeles Times reported that, during the criminal trial, demonstrators outside the courtroom chanted "Bernhard Goetz, you can't hide; we charge you with genocide."

Initial sources differed in reporting the sequence of shots fired, timing of shots, whether Cabey was shot once or twice, and whether any of the men Goetz shot were armed. Some reports, picking up on Goetz's statement to the police, suggested that Cabey had been shot twice, but medical evidence introduced at trial showed that he had been shot only once, in the left side. Additionally, early reports suggested that the teenagers had approached Goetz carrying "sharpened" screwdrivers; those reports, too, were found to be false: The screwdrivers—Cabey carried two and Ramseur carried one—were not sharpened and, based on the available testimony, were not removed from Cabey's or Ramseur's pockets—no witnesses reported seeing screwdrivers, and Goetz repeatedly denied he was threatened with them. When Canty testified at Goetz's criminal trial, he said they were to be used to break into video arcade change boxes and not as weapons.

Supporters viewed Goetz as a hero for standing up to his attackers and defending himself in an environment where the police were increasingly viewed as ineffective in combating crime. The Guardian Angels, a volunteer patrol group of mostly black and Hispanic teenagers, collected thousands of dollars from subway riders toward a legal defense fund for Goetz. The Congress of Racial Equality (CORE), a right-leaning civil rights organization, supported Goetz. CORE's director, Roy Innis, (who would later be elected to the executive board of the NRA) offered to raise defense money. Innis, who lost two of his sons to inner-city gun violence, said Goetz was "the avenger for all of us," and called for a volunteer force of armed civilians to patrol the streets. A legal group founded by the National Rifle Organization—the Firearms Civil Rights Legal Defense Fund—gave $20,000 to provide for the defense of Goetz. Harvard Professor of Government James Q. Wilson explained the broad sentiment by saying, "It may simply indicate that there are no more liberals on the crime and law-and-order issue in New York City, because they've all been mugged."

Professor Stephen L. Carter bemoaned the public's initial reaction to the shooting, arguing, "The tragedy of the Goetz case is that a public barely aware of the facts was rooting for him to get away with it. The tragedy is that a public eager to identify transgressors in advance decided from the start that Mr. Goetz was a hero and that his black victims deserved what they got."

While race was never explicitly mentioned at the criminal trial, Professor George P. Fletcher argued that Goetz's criminal-defense team—which referred to the men Goetz shot as “savages,” “predators,” and “vultures”—made a "covert appeal to racial bias," which, he said,

came out most dramatically in [a re-enactment] of the shooting. . . . The nominal purpose of the demonstration was to show the way in which the bullet entered the body of each victim. The defense’s real purpose, however, was to recreate for the jury . . . the scene that Goetz encountered when four black passengers began to surround him. [Goetz’s attorney] asked the Guardian Angels [a volunteer crime patrol organization] to send him . . . four young black men to act as the props in the demonstration. In came the four young black Guardian Angels, fit and muscular, dressed in T-shirts, to play the parts . . . .

Professor Bennett Capers agreed that the use of the four "large black men" to stand in for the "four black youths" was, effectively, a "backdoor race-ing."

As to the criminal verdict, Benjamin Hooks, director of the NAACP, called the outcome "inexcusable," adding, "It was proven—according to his own statements—that Goetz did the shooting and went far beyond the realm of self-defense. There was no provocation for what he did." Representative Floyd Flake agreed, saying, "I think that if a black had shot four whites, the cry for the death penalty would have been almost automatic."

United States Attorney Rudolph Giuliani met with Black political and religious leaders calling for a Federal civil rights investigations. C. Vernon Mason, an attorney and spokesperson for the group, said, "We have come to the Federal Government as black people traditionally have done to seek redress when it is clear that state and local authorities have either failed to act or are incapable of acting." After an investigation, Giuliani ultimately determined that Goetz had acted out of fear, which he distinguished from a "racial motivation." In a 2007 interview with Stone Phillips of Dateline NBC, Goetz admitted that his fear was enhanced due to the fact that the four men he shot were black.

Subsequent developments
After reaching an all-time peak in 1990, crime in New York City dropped dramatically through the rest of the 1990s, with Rudy Giuliani emphasizing reduction in crime as mayor. By 2006, New York City had statistically become one of the safest large cities in the U.S., with its crime rate being ranked 194th of the 210 American cities with populations over 100,000. New York City crime rates by 2014 were comparable to those of the early 1960s.

Darrell Cabey fell into a coma after the shooting; he suffered irreversible brain damage and was paralyzed from the waist down. In 1985, the Bronx District Attorney determined that Cabey had the mental capacity of an eight year old. Goetz accused Cabey of exaggerating his injuries. Goetz questioned Cabey as to his injuries in two depositions and was unable to elicit an answer longer than a single sentence; when asked, Cabey denied having previously heard the name "Bernie Goetz".

Troy Canty acquired a criminal record of petty offenses before entering drug-rehabilitation and vocational-training programs. One of Canty's attorneys, Scott H. Greenfield reported that Canty planned to attend culinary school. In 2017, Greenfield blogged that he had lost touch with Canty.

In March 1985, James Ramseur reported to police that two men apparently hired by Goetz kidnapped and attempted to murder him. The following day, after detectives played back to Ramseur the emergency 911 recording reporting the kidnapping, Ramseur admitted it was his voice on the call and to fabricating the report. Ramseur explained it was merely to test police response when a black person was a crime victim, and was not prosecuted for this hoax. Ramseur was convicted in 1986 of the 1985 rape, sodomizing, and robbery of a young pregnant woman. Conditionally released in 2002, Ramseur returned to prison for a parole violation in 2005; he finished his sentence in July 2010. On December 22, 2011, the 27th anniversary of the shooting, James Ramseur died at age 45 of a drug overdose in an apparent suicide.

In 1989, Barry Allen was charged with robbing a 58-year-old man of $54. In 1991, he was convicted of the offense, and sentenced to 3.5 to 7 years.

Goetz achieved celebrity status as a popular cultural symbol of a public disgusted with urban crime and disorder. In 2001 he ran unsuccessfully for mayor of New York City. In 2004, Goetz was interviewed by Nancy Grace on Larry King Live, where he stated his actions were good for New York City and forced the city to address crime. In 2005, Goetz unsuccessfully ran for public advocate; on his campaign website, he described the shooting:

I decided to shoot as many as I could as quickly as I could. I did a fast draw, and shot with one hand (my right), pulling the trigger prior to the gun being aligned on the targets. All actual shots plus my draw time occurred easily within 1.6 seconds or less. This is not as difficult to do as some might think, and occasionally I give a description of the technique along with a re-enactment. The first shot hit Canty in the center of the chest. After the first shot my vision changed and I lost my sense of hearing. The second shot hit lightning fast Barry Allen in the upper rear shoulder as he was ducking (later the bullet was removed from his arm). The third shot hit the subway wall just in front of Cabey; the fourth shot hit Cabey in the left side (severing his spinal cord and rendering him paraplegic). The fifth shot hit Ramseur's arm on the way into his left side. I immediately looked at the first two to make sure they were "taken care of," and then attempted to shoot Cabey again in the stomach, but the gun was empty. I thought Cabey was shot twice after reading a media account no shots missed; I had lost count of the shots and while under adrenaline I didn't even hear the shots or feel the kick of the gun. 'You don't look too bad, here's another', is a phrase I came up with later when trying to explain the shooting while I was under the impression that Cabey was shot twice. Cabey, who was briefly standing prior to the shooting, was sitting on the subway bench during all attempted shots. The others were standing. Shortly after the shooting my vision and hearing returned to normal.

In 2010, Goetz was interviewed and did a dry fire shooting demonstration on the inaugural episode of The Biography Channel's documentary show Aftermath with William Shatner.

In November 2013 Goetz was arrested for allegedly selling marijuana. After Goetz's attorneys moved for a dismissal on speedy-trial grounds, a judge agreed that prosecutors took 14 days too long to prosecute the case, and it was dismissed in September 2014.

In popular culture

 Law & Order episodes Subterranean Homeboy Blues and Self Defense have similarities with the subway shooting incident.
 Goetz is mentioned in several songs such as:
Agnostic Front's song "Shoot His Load" on their 1986 album Cause for Alarm
Beastie Boys song "B-Boy Bouillabaisse" ("Stop That Train" segment) from their 1989 album Paul's Boutique
Billy Joel's 1989 single "We Didn't Start the Fire"
Lou Reed's song "Hold On", from his 1989 album New York
Wu-Tang Clan's song "Clan in da Front" from their 1993 debut album Enter the Wu-Tang (36 Chambers)
 Big L's song "Da Graveyard" (featuring Lord Finesse, Microphone Nut, Jay-Z, Party Arty, and Grand Daddy I.U.) from his 1995 debut album Lifestylez ov da Poor & Dangerous
R.A. the Rugged Man's song "E.K.N.Y." (featuring Inspectah Deck) from his 2020 album All My Heroes Are Dead
 In the Family Guy episode "Stewie Kills Lois" Quagmire says Peter is a killer like Bernie Goetz and reveals he used to do a stand-up comedy bit on him.
 In the Criminal Minds Season 1, Episode 17 "A Real Rain" - Multiple references throughout.  
 The shooting partially inspired the 2019 film Joker, whose depiction of the Joker is partially based on Goetz. The titular character is a lower income, inner city resident who has been jumped and robbed multiple times, so he obtains a firearm to defend himself. When he gets jumped on the subway, he shoots and kills the perpetrators and flees the scene, with the shooting earning strong media coverage and the then-unknown perpetrator inadvertently becoming a folk hero among lower-class city residents who are angry about being victimized; in this case, the victims are wealthy white men, unlike Goetz's victims. Todd Phillips, who wrote, produced and directed the film, grew up in New York City and remembered the 1984 subway shooting from his youth.

References

Explanatory Notes

Citations

Sources

 Subway Gunman: A Juror's Account of the Bernhard Goetz Trial.
 A Crime of Self-Defense : Bernhard Goetz and the Law on Trial. 
 People Vs. Goetz: The Summations and the Charges to the Jury.

External links
 
 Personal site of Goetz
 Justice Stephen G. Crane Papers on the Bernhard Goetz Trial and Other Cases, 1981–2000, MS 3152, at the New-York Historical Society.

1984 crimes in the United States
1980s crimes in New York City
1980s in Manhattan
1984 in New York City
Non-fatal shootings
Crimes in Manhattan
December 1984 events in the United States
Defensive gun use
New York City Subway crimes
1984 mass shootings in the United States
Mass shootings in New York City